John Grindrod may refer to:
 John Grindrod (bishop)
 John Grindrod (author)